Peter Schmidt may refer to:

Peter Schmidt (artist) (1931–1980), British artist and teacher
Pyotr Schmidt (1867–1906), Russian revolutionary, circa 1905
Peter Schmidt (born 1782) (1782–1845), Norwegian merchant and politician
Peter Lebrecht Schmidt (born 1933), German classical scholar
Peter Schmidt (footballer) (born 1943), Austrian footballer
Peter Schmidt (author) (born 1944), German author, recipient of the Deutscher Krimi Preis
Peter Schmidt (economist), American economist and econometrician
Peter Schmidt (political scientist), see Werner Bergmann
Peter B. Schmidt, Democratic member of the New Hampshire House of Representatives
Peter Schmidt (Wisconsin politician)
Peter Schmidt (water polo) (born 1937), German Olympic water polo player
Peter Schmidt (zoologist) (1872–1949), Russian zoologist and ichthyologist